"January" is a pop rock song recorded by Scottish rock band Pilot. Written by David Paton and produced by Alan Parsons, "January" was the sole number-one single in the UK for Pilot, coincidentally going to the top of the charts on 26 January 1975. It stayed at number one for three weeks.

In a video interview on Radio Borders, David Paton explained that the song was not about the month, but about a girl named January, the name being taken from a female protagonist in a book that his wife was reading at the time. The verse is unrelated to the chorus and talks about the success of "Magic" and how it had opened up the world for him. It also charted in the United States, making a minor impression on the Billboard Hot 100, in early 1976. It also went to number one in Australia, where it stayed for eight weeks.

During the month of January 2016, the song was a feature of adverts for ASDA stores within the UK.

Chart performance

Weekly charts

Year-end charts

Cover versions
David Cassidy covered "January" on his 1976 album, Home Is Where the Heart Is.

References

External links 
 Pilot - "January" (1974) song to be listened as stream on Spotify

1974 songs
1975 singles
Pilot (band) songs
David Cassidy songs
UK Singles Chart number-one singles
Number-one singles in Australia
Irish Singles Chart number-one singles
Songs written by David Paton
Song recordings produced by Alan Parsons